The 1850–51 United States Senate elections were held on various dates in various states. As these U.S. Senate elections were prior to the ratification of the Seventeenth Amendment in 1913, senators were chosen by state legislatures. Senators were elected over a wide range of time throughout 1850 and 1851, and a seat may have been filled months late or remained vacant due to legislative deadlock. In these elections, terms were up for the senators in Class 1.

The Democratic Party lost seats, but retained a majority in the Senate.

Results summary 
Senate party division, 32nd Congress (1851–1853)

 Majority party: Democratic (34–35)
 Minority party: Whig Party (21–23)
 Other parties: Free Soiler (2–3)
 Total seats: 62

Change in composition

Before the elections

As a result of the elections

At the beginning of the first session, December 1, 1851

Race summaries

Elections during the 31st Congress 
In these elections, the winners were seated during 1850 or in 1851 before March 4; ordered by election date.

Races leading to the 32nd Congress 
In these regular elections, the winners were elected for the term beginning March 4, 1851; ordered by state.

All of the elections involved the Class 1 seats.

Elections during the 32nd Congress 
In late these elections, the winners were elected in 1851 after March 4; ordered by election date.

Race leading to the 33rd Congress 

In this regular election, the winner was elected for the term beginning March 4, 1853.

This election involved a Class 3 seat.

Kentucky

Kentucky (early) 

One-term Whig Joseph R. Underwood retired and the Know Nothing Lieutenant Governor of Kentucky John Burton Thompson was elected early, December 15, 1851, far in advance of the 1853 term, as was common practice at the time.

Kentucky (special) 

Long-term Whig and former-United States Secretary of State Henry Clay announced his resignation December 17, 1851 from the class 3 seat, to be effective September 6, 1852.

Whig Archibald Dixon was elected December 31, 1851.

After many ballots, the vote in the final deciding ballot was:

Before Clay's resignation was effective, he died June 24, 1852.  Democratic Secretary of State of Kentucky David Meriwether was appointed July 6, 1852 pending the effective date of the special election.  Dixon was then seated September 1, 1852 to finish the term that would end in 1855.

Maryland

Maryland (special) 

Reverdy Johnson won election in 1844 but retired to become the United States Attorney General. In order to fill his seat, David Stewart was elected as a temporary appointment until a successor could be elected. Thomas Pratt won election by an unknown margin of votes, for the Class 1 seat.

Maryland (regular) 

Thomas Pratt won election to a full term by an unknown margin of votes, for the Class 1 seat.

Massachusetts 

In 1851, Democrats gained control of the legislature in coalition with the Free Soilers. However, the legislature deadlocked on this Senate race, as Democrats refused to vote for Charles Sumner (the Free Soilers' choice).

New York 

The election in New York was held on February 4 and March 18 and 19, 1851. Daniel S. Dickinson (Democratic) had been elected in 1845 to this seat, and his term would expire on March 3, 1851. The Whig Party in New York was split in two opposing factions: the Seward/Weed faction (the majority, opposed to the Compromise of 1850) and the "Silver Grays" (supporters of President Millard Fillmore and his compromise legislation, led by Francis Granger whose silver gray hair originated the faction's nickname). The opposing factions of the Democratic Party in New York, the "Barnburners" and the "Hunkers", had reunited at the State election in November 1850, and managed to have almost their whole State ticket elected, only Horatio Seymour was defeated for Governor by a plurality of 262 votes.

At the State election in November 1849, 14 Seward Whigs, 3 Silver Gray Whigs and 15 Democrats were elected for a two-year term (1850–1851) in the State Senate. At the State election in November 1850, a Whig majority was elected to the Assembly for the session of 1851. The 74th New York State Legislature met from January 7 to April 17, and from June 10 to July 11, 1851, at Albany, New York.

Ex-Governor of New York Hamilton Fish was the candidate of the Whig Party, but was also a close friend of Henry Clay who was one of the leaders of the Fillmore faction in Washington, D.C. He was thus considered the only viable compromise candidate. The Silver Grays asked Fish to pledge his support for the Compromise, but Fish refused to make any comment, saying that he did not seek the office, and that the legislators should vote guided by Fish's known political history. Fish had earlier stated his opposition against the Fugitive Slave Law of 1850 but was believed to support most of the remainder of the Compromise. Nevertheless, Silver Gray State Senator James W. Beekman declared that he would not vote for Fish for personal reasons, a dislike stemming from the time when they were fellow students at Columbia University.

The State Legislature met on February 4, the legally prescribed day, to elect a U.S. Senator. In the Assembly, Fish received a majority of 78 to 49. In the State Senate the vote stood 16 for Fish and 16 votes for a variety of candidates, among them Beekman's vote for Francis Granger. After a second ballot with the same result, Beekman moved to adjourn, which was carried by the casting vote of the lieutenant governor, and no nomination was made.

On February 14, Senator George B. Guinnip offered a resolution to declare John Adams Dix elected to the U.S. Senate. On motion of Senator George R. Babcock, the resolution was laid on the table, i.e. consideration was postponed.

On February 15, Guinnip again offered a resolution to declare John Adams Dix elected to the U.S. Senate. Senator Stephen H. Johnson offered an amendment to this resolution, declaring Daniel S. Dickinson elected. On motion of Senator Marius Schoonmaker, the resolution was laid on the table too.

On March 18, when two Democratic State Senators were absent, having gone to New York City, the Whigs persuaded the Democrats in a 14-hour session to re-open the U.S. Senate election, and Senate electionin the small hours of March 19 Fish was nominated by a vote of 16 to 12 (Beekman, Johnson (both Whigs), Thomas B. Carroll and William A. Dart (both Democratic) did not vote).

Fish was the choice of both the Assembly and the Senate, and was declared elected.

Ohio 

Incumbent Senator Thomas Corwin (Whig) resigned July 20, 1850 to become U.S. Secretary of the Treasury. Thomas Ewing (Whig) was appointed July 20, 1850 to finish the term. Benjamin Wade (Whig) was elected late on March 15, 1851 on the 37th ballot over Ewing.

Pennsylvania 

The Pennsylvania election was held January 14, 1851. Richard Brodhead was elected by the Pennsylvania General Assembly to the United States Senate.

|-

|-bgcolor="#EEEEEE"
| colspan="3" align="right" | Totals
| align="right" | 133
| align="right" | 100.00%

|}

See also
 1850 United States elections
 1850–51 United States House of Representatives elections
 31st United States Congress
 32nd United States Congress

References

Sources 
 Party Division in the Senate, 1789-Present, via Senate.gov
 The New York Civil List compiled in 1858 (see: pg. 63 for U.S. Senators [gives wrong date for election "November 19"]; pg. 137 for State Senators 1851; pg. 240ff for Members of Assembly 1851)
 Members of the 32nd United States Congress
 Hamilton Fish by Amos Elwood Corning (pages 35ff)
 Result Assembly:  Journal of the Assembly (74th Session) (1851; Vol. I, pg. 268f and 662)
 Result Senate: Journal of the Senate (74th Session) (1851; pg. 136f and 322)
 The Papers of Henry Clay (Vol. 10; page 859)
 The Rise and Fall of the American Whig Party by Michael F. Holt (pages 649f)
 
 Pennsylvania Election Statistics: 1682-2006 from the Wilkes University Election Statistics Project